VCU Rams women's tennis represents Virginia Commonwealth University. The team is coached by Vivian Segnini.

Facilities

Thalhimer Tennis Center

The six court facility currently holds 300 people, and is located between Main and Cary Street in VCU's Monroe Park Campus.

New Tennis Center

The 2014-2020 six year capital plan calls for a 14 million dollar, state-of-the-art, modern Tennis center that will include 6 indoor courts, a spectator viewing space, and 12 outdoor courts.

VCU Rams All-Americans
Martina Nedelková (1998, 2001)
Andrea Ondrisova (2000, 2002)
Barbora Zahnova (2003)
Silvia Urickova (2003)
Marianna Yuferova (2005)
Olga Borisova (2005)
Tatsiana Uvarova (2006)

References